The striped sparrow (Oriturus superciliosus) is a species of bird in the family Passerellidae. It is monotypic within the genus Oriturus.

It is endemic to Mexico where its natural habitats are subtropical or tropical moist montane forest and temperate grassland.

References

striped sparrow
striped sparrow
Endemic birds of Mexico
striped sparrow
Taxonomy articles created by Polbot
Birds of the Sierra Madre Occidental
Birds of the Trans-Mexican Volcanic Belt